The 1961 Commonwealth Prime Ministers' Conference was the 11th Meeting of the Heads of Government of the Commonwealth of Nations. It was held in the United Kingdom in March 1961, and was hosted by that country's Prime Minister, Harold Macmillan.

While Commonwealth conferences were normally held biennially, this conference was held after an interval of only a year following the May 1960 conference due to disagreement over South Africa and whether the country should be removed from the Commonwealth due to its policy of racial segregation. Malaya's Prime Minister demanded South Africa's expulsion.

South African Prime Minister H.F. Verwoerd, attended the conference to give formal notice that his country was to become a republic in May 1961 after having approved the constitutional change in an October 1960 referendum. South Africa's application was opposed by the leaders of African states under black majority rule, as well as Indian Prime Minister Jawaharlal Nehru, Malaya's Tunku Abdul Rahman, and the other non-white Commonwealth countries as well as Canadian prime minister John Diefenbaker due to South Africa's policy of apartheid. Canada was the only member of the old white Commonwealth to oppose South Africa's application. The "Keep South Africa In" group included Britain's Harold Macmillan, Rhodesia and Nyasaland's Roy Welensky, Australia's Robert Menzies and Keith Holyoake of New Zealand. Canadian prime minister John Diefenbaker proposed that South Africa only be re-admitted if it joined other states in condemning apartheid in principle. Once it became clear that South Africa's membership would be rejected, Verwoerd withdrew his country's application and left the conference.

Concerns were also expressed about Britain's prospective membership in the Common Market and the possible impact on trade relations between the United Kingdom and the Commonwealth. The Commonwealth also expressed its support for worldwide disarmament "subject to effective inspection and control".

Cyprus' application to join the Commonwealth, following its independence the previous year, was approved over the opposition of the United Kingdom which objected as Cyprus had not applied for membership prior to independence as had been customary. Cyprus' President, Archbishop Makarios III, joined the conference once the decision on his country's membership was made. The membership application of Sierra Leone was also accepted and became effective upon its independence on 27 April.

This was the first Commonwealth conference in which one of the heads of government was a woman, Sirimavo Ratwatte Dias Bandaranaike, who was also the first female prime minister in the world.

Participants

References

External links
John Diefenbaker: Staring down South Africa, CBC Archives, 17 March 1961

1961 in London
1961
Diplomatic conferences in the United Kingdom
20th-century diplomatic conferences
1961 in international relations
United Kingdom and the Commonwealth of Nations
Events associated with apartheid
1961 in Cyprus
1961 in South Africa
1961 conferences
March 1961 events in the United Kingdom
Cyprus and the Commonwealth of Nations
South Africa and the Commonwealth of Nations
1960s in the City of Westminster
Harold Macmillan
Robert Menzies
John Diefenbaker
Kwame Nkrumah
Jawaharlal Nehru